The Dunn–Binnall House & Farmstead is a historic residence and farm in American Fork, Utah, United States, that is listed on the National Register of Historic Places.

Description
The farmstead, which was built in 1883, is located at 352 North 200 East. It includes Greek Revival and Bungalow/craftsman architecture.  It was listed on the National Register of Historic Places February 1, 2010.  The listing included eight contributing buildings.

See also

 National Register of Historic Places listings in Utah County, Utah

References

External links

Houses completed in 1883
Greek Revival houses in Utah
Houses on the National Register of Historic Places in Utah
Houses in Utah County, Utah
Buildings and structures in American Fork, Utah
National Register of Historic Places in Utah County, Utah